Tom Mellor (born 13 August 1990) is an English footballer who is currently an assistant coach for the Harrisburg Heat of the Major Arena Soccer League.

External links

 Notre Dame College bio

1990 births
Living people
English footballers
English expatriate footballers
Ottawa Fury (2005–2013) players
Harrisburg Heat (MASL) players
Penn FC players
Expatriate soccer players in Canada
Expatriate soccer players in the United States
USL League Two players
USL Championship players
Association football forwards
English expatriate sportspeople in the United States
English expatriate sportspeople in Canada
Major Arena Soccer League players
Notre Dame Falcons men's soccer players
Major Arena Soccer League coaches
Player-coaches